The 2006 Liberty Bowl was a college football postseason bowl game played on December 29, 2006, at Liberty Bowl Memorial Stadium in Memphis, Tennessee.  The 48th edition of the Liberty Bowl pitted the Houston Cougars against the South Carolina Gamecocks. With sponsorship from AutoZone, the game was officially the AutoZone Liberty Bowl. South Carolina won the game by a score of 44–36.

References

Liberty Bowl
Liberty Bowl
Houston Cougars football bowl games
South Carolina Gamecocks football bowl games
2006 in sports in Tennessee
December 2006 sports events in the United States